The Funk House is located at 1202 Olympia Avenue NE in Olympia, Washington. The house was built in 1892 in the Queen Anne style for Brad and Ann Davis.

References

Houses on the National Register of Historic Places in Washington (state)
Houses completed in 1906
History of Olympia, Washington
Buildings and structures in Olympia, Washington
Houses in Thurston County, Washington
National Register of Historic Places in Olympia, Washington
1906 establishments in Washington (state)